Serge-Paul Loga (born August 14, 1969) is a Cameroonian retired footballer who played for Prevoyance Yaoundé. He also participated at the  1994 FIFA World Cup.

References

1969 births
Living people
Footballers from Yaoundé
Cameroonian footballers
Cameroon international footballers
1994 FIFA World Cup players
Association football midfielders